Moncton South is a provincial electoral district for the Legislative Assembly of New Brunswick, Canada. It occupies the southern portion of the city of Moncton.

It was created in 1973 out of the multi-member district of Moncton as Moncton West. It 1994, its boundaries were changed losing much of its northern part to Moncton Crescent while it also expanded to the east and, as a result, its name was changed to Moncton South. In 2006, it lost much of the territory it had gained to the east and was returned to its original name of Moncton West. In 2013 it expanded eastward again, taking in downtown Moncton, and was again renamed Moncton South.

On 17 April 2007, the MLA for the district at the time, Joan MacAlpine-Stiles crossed the floor from the Progressive Conservatives to sit as a Liberal, along with her husband, Wally Stiles, who was the MLA for Petitcodiac.

Members of the Legislative Assembly

This riding has elected the following Members of Legislative Assembly:

Election results

2020 election

2018 election

2014 election

2010 election

2006 election

2003 election

1999 election

1995 election

1991 election

1987 election

1982 election

1978 election

1974 election

References

External links 
Website of the Legislative Assembly of New Brunswick
Map of riding as of 2018

New Brunswick provincial electoral districts
Politics of Moncton